Kinder der Landstrasse (literally: Children of the Country Road) was a project of the Swiss foundation Pro Juventute, active from  1926 to 1973. The focus of the project was the assimilation of the itinerant Yenish people in Switzerland by forcibly removing children from their parents, placing them in orphanages or foster homes. A  total of  about 590 children were affected by the program.

History 
In 1926, Pro Juventute started – supported by the federal authorities and official institutions – 
systematically taking children away from Yenish families living in Switzerland and placing them in foster homes, psychiatric hospitals and even prisons. This so-called "re-education" had the goal of establishing Yenish families, and particularly the next generation, in a 'sedentary' lifestyle. After 47 years of those unremitting activities, the affected people obtained in 1973, with the support of the media, an end to these practices.
 
As the legal basis of the forced separation of families and children, the Swiss Civil Code (Zivilgesetzbuch) of 1912, empowered officials to take away the custody of parents from children in cases of neglect or abuse at the hands of the parents. Although the Civil Code mentioned a supervision over the work of the authorities, this was rarely enforced. The 'legal fact' that the children were members of a traveling (Yenish) family was considered in and of itself a sufficient reason to take away the children from their parents. 
 
As a professionally welfare justification generic psychiatric reports, which let the "Fund" the full control over his wards. The 'general scientific basis' for the attitude of those responsible functioneers was primarily the conviction of the harmfulness of family socialization "categorized as asocial families, as families who were traveling with origin per se". These fascist assumption informed at the same time in "hereditary biological notions of inferior 'genetic asocial material', whether sedentary or not, that will "damage the valuable heritage of the settled majority population, if its disclosure would not prevent."
 
Therefore, the "charity" was anxious to detain children, both not sedentary and sedentary families, propelled implement of origin or in foreign families. Not a real driving lifestyle of the parents was the decisive criterion of a child removal, but "belonging to a collective wearer as socially damaging properties classified fringe group of tinker, basketters, scissor sharpener, beggars, "or worse". In some cases, children have been taken away from their mothers immediately after birth. The children were housed usually in homes, in some cases also in foreign families, in psychiatric hospitals and in prisons or assigned as forced child laborers to farming families. Contacts between children and parents were systematically prevented. Sometimes even the term of "charity ward" was changed to remain undetectable for their relatives. Child abuse was legitimized as education for work. In the 1930/40s the child removals peaked, resulting in more than 200 Yenish children under the control of "charity".

Among the protagonists of such population sanitary and racial hygiene concepts, namely psychiatrist Josef Jörgerstraße (canton of Graubünden with his psychiatric-eugenic writings on the fictitious "Family Zero" or the German eugenicists and self-proclaimed "Gypsy expert" Robert Ritter. Federal Heinrich Haberlin, Board of Trustees President Pro Juventute, described the Yenish people in a brochure published in 1927 as "a dark spot in our culture on his order so proud Swiss countryside", which it applies to eliminate. The "charity" needed and found the support of dispensaries, teachers, pastors and non-profit organizations. The legislation opened maneuver, which were often but extensively used in different ways. The limits were exceeded to open illegality.

The scandal got in the even international focus before 1972, as the Beobachter newspaper's journalists investigated, after the newspaper got hints by affected Yenish people, and as the first media, Hans Caprez published on 15 April 1972 in the article Kinder der Landstrasse the facts and the background involving in all about 590 children of the Yenish people minority in Switzerland.

Controversy and aftermath 
In the aftermath of the project, it was intensively discussed and condemned in Switzerland, as well as in several books and movies.

Public pressure prompted Pro Juventute then after, to dissolve the "Fund" in spring 1973: Remaining guardianships were abolished or transferred to other persons. The Swiss authorities that had had co-initiated the "Fund" 37 years ago, was forced by the public disgust to pay financial compensation from 2000 to 7000 Swiss francs per victim. A prosecution of those responsible for the project, in particular of the two main actors Alfred Siegfried (1890–1972) and Clara Reust (1916–2000), as well as the person responsible in the guardianship authorities who did not fulfill their supervisory role, was never done.

In 1975, for the first time, Yenish people were recognized as an independent ethnic group in the Canton of Bern, and since the 1980s, self-help organizations try to provide redress and rehabilitation of the slandered victims that even by pseudo-scientific programs were mistreated.

The UN Genocide Convention, signed on 9 December 1948, qualifies forcibly transferring of children of a "national, ethnic, racial or religious group to another group" in the intent to destroy, in whole or in part, as a genocide. This is followed by the Swiss criminal law in general in Art. 264 (Strafgesetzbuch) as ".... marked by their nationality, race, religion or ethnicity group". The most relevant fact, whether the Yenish people are one of the groups the convention respectively Swiss law are attributable, is affirmed by parts of the recent scientific work, and at least will further have to be discussed in the public, also in the context to Child labour in Switzerland.
 
Government redress was promised after years of public reparation, a proper rehabilitation and an apology by the Federal Council (Bundesrat), however not so far, and there only "emergency" payments were made at a ridiculously low level of each several thousand Swiss Francs to the meanwhile old-aged surviving victims of Kinder der Landstrasse.

The foundation Naschet Jenische (literally: arise, Yenish!) was established in 1986, focusing on the refurbishment and 'reparations' of the injustice perpetrated against the Yenish (Fahrende) people in Switzerland, in particular by the program Kinder der Landstrasse. In 1988 a fund commission, which regulated the inspection for the affected Yenish people, was established and completed their work in 1992. The inspection of the files of Pro Juventute is governed since then directly by the Swiss Federal Archives (Bundesarchiv). The affected Yenish people received in all 11 million Swiss Francs, but not more than 20,000 Swiss Francs each. The advice and support of people and families affected by Kinder der Landstrasse is still the main focus of the activities of the foundation. The foundation advises Yenish people in personal, family and social problems, in particular in contacts with the Swiss authorities, and assists in the inspection of personal files. The foundation also supports the search and the reuninicfaction of families. Yenish people are assisted with applications for financial assistance to public and private institutions. Advice can be also invoked in the case of difficulties with insurance and taxes. The consultancy activity is financed by Pro Juventute. Another important part of the foundation's activities are the public relations; Naschet Jenische informs about the history and the current situation in Switzerland and arbitrates contacts.

In 2014, the Swiss national Wiedergutmachungsinitiative (reparation initiative) was tangentially related, although it primarily concerned 
the fates of the so-called Verdingkinder (literally: forced child laborers), another 'integration project' related to 'misplaced persons' which were placed as cheap labour at Swiss farms, among them also Yenish juveniles affected by "Kinder der Landstrasse", but not their families.

Cinema and television 
 2009: Von Menschen und Akten - die Aktion Kinder der Landstrasse der Stiftung Pro Juventute, DVD of the book of the same name for educational use
 2008: Hunkeler macht Sachen
 1992: Kinder der Landstrasse, Swiss-Austrian-German movie by Urs Egger
 1991: Die letzten freien Menschen, documentary by Oliver M. Meyer

See also 
 American Indian boarding schools
 Stolen Generations

References 

 Sara Galle and Thomas Meier: Von Menschen und Akten - die Aktion Kinder der Landstrasse der Stiftung Pro Juventute. Chronos Verlag, Zürich 2009, .
 Marco Leuenberger: Versorgt und vergessen: Ehemalige Verdingkinder erzählen. Rotpunktverlag, Züricch 2008. 
 Thomas Huonker, Regula Ludi: Roma, Sinti und Jenische. Schweizerische Zigeunerpolitik zur Zeit des Nationalsozialismus. Beitrag zur Forschung (Veröffentlichungen der UEK, Band 23). Chronos Verlag, Zürich 2001, 
 Walter Leimgruber, Thomas Meier and Roger Sablonier, redaction by Bernadette Kaufmann: Kinder zwischen Rädern. Kurzfassung des Forschungsberichts «Das Hilfswerk für die Kinder der Landstrasse». Published by and in order of Bundesamt für Kultur «und Kinder» 20, Nr. 67, November 2001, Zürich 2001.
 Mariella Mehr: Kinder der Landstrasse: ein Hilfswerk, ein Theater und die Folgen. Zytglogge-Verlag, Stuttgart/Bern 1987, .

External links 
among others:
 Kinder der Landstrasse on the website of the Swiss Federal Archives (Schweizerisches Bundesarchiv) 
 
 Kinder der Landstrasse on the website of the Swiss Television 

1926 establishments in Switzerland
1973 disestablishments in Switzerland
Projects established in 1926
Projects disestablished in 1973
Projects in Europe
Social history of Switzerland
Youth in Switzerland
Political controversies in Switzerland
Political history of Switzerland
Human rights abuses
Racism in Switzerland
Cultural assimilation
Adoption history
Adoption, fostering, orphan care and displacement
Kidnapped Swiss children
Yenish people
Child labour in Switzerland